Ahmet Necdet Sezer (born 13 September 1941) is a Turkish statesman and judge who served as the tenth president of Turkey from 2000 to 2007. Previously he was president of the Constitutional Court of Turkey from 1998 to 2002. The Grand National Assembly of Turkey elected Sezer as president in 2000 after Süleyman Demirel's seven-year term expired. He was succeeded by Abdullah Gül in 2007.

Following his legal career, Sezer became a candidate for the presidency with the joint support of many political parties in Parliament. Following the 2000 presidential election, he took an ardent secularist approach on issues such as the headscarf, holding the view that secularism in Turkey was under threat. A quarrel between Sezer and Prime Minister Bülent Ecevit in 2001 led to a financial meltdown, attributed to the weakness of the coalition government as well as to the large debt owed to the International Monetary Fund.

The landslide victory of the conservative Islamist Justice and Development Party (AKP) in the 2002 general election led to strong opposition from President Sezer, who vetoed several proposed laws and referred others to the Constitutional Court. These included laws on banking reform and the lifting of the political ban on Recep Tayyip Erdoğan. During receptions at the presidential palace, Sezer refused to allow women wearing the headscarf to attend citing the laws on the separation of mosque and state at the time; this resulted in the wives of Abdullah Gül and Erdoğan, Hayrünnisa Gül and Emine Erdoğan respectively, being barred from attendance. Erdoğan later said in public that he had 'suffered a lot' from Sezer.

During the 2014 presidential election, won by Erdoğan, Sezer openly refused to vote, citing the lack of a secularist candidate as his reason.

Early life
Sezer was born in Afyonkarahisar to Ahmet Hamdi Sezer and Hatice Sezer. His parents came from Serres in Greece during the population exchange between Greece and Turkey. After finishing Afyonkarahisar High School in 1958, he graduated from the Ankara University Faculty of Law in 1962 and began his career as a judge in Ankara. Following his military service at the Military Academy, he served first as a judge in Dicle and Yerköy, and then became a supervisory judge in the High Court of Appeals in Ankara. In 1978, he received an LL.M. in civil law from the Faculty of Law in Ankara University.

Chief justice
On 7 March 1983, Sezer was elected as a member of the High Court of Appeals. As a member of the Second Chamber of Law, he was nominated by the plenary assembly of the High Court of Appeals as one of the three candidates for appointment as member of the Constitutional Court. On 27 September 1988, he was appointed as a member of the Constitutional Court by President Kenan Evren. On 6 January 1998, Ahmet Necdet Sezer was elected chief justice of the Constitutional Court.

Presidency (2000–2007)

He was elected president and sworn in on 16 May 2000, becoming Turkey's first head of state to come from a judicial background. His term was due to expire on 16 May 2007, but because the Grand National Assembly of Turkey had failed to elect a new president, he retained the office pro tempore until 28 August 2007 (the Constitution of Turkey states that a president's term of office is extended until a successor is elected).

On 21 February 2001, during a quarrel in a National Security Council meeting, he threw the constitutional code book at Prime Minister Bülent Ecevit.  Some cite this falling-out as the main reason for what became known as 'Black Wednesday', a huge economic crisis. Others claimed that the rapid reforms called for by the accession negotiations with the European Union and Turkey's strong ties with the International Monetary Fund caused the crisis.

Sezer was a firm defender of secularism in Turkey, a frequent point of contention between him and the ruling AKP party. On many occasions, he openly claimed that Turkey's secular regime was under threat. Since he believes that Islam does not require women to wear headscarves, Sezer excluded legislators' wives who wore headscarves from official receptions at the Presidential Palace. 

During his presidency, he pardoned 260 convicted felons, 202 of whom were captured leftist militants. (This type of pardon can be requested directly by the felon or the legal representative of the felon, but no political or court referral is necessary.) Some organisations have cited such pardons to criticise Sezer's presidency. On the other hand, Sezer also enacted harsher laws to punish people connected with terrorism.

Awards and orders

References

External links

 Former presidents: Ahmet Necdet Sezer, Presidency of the Republic of Turkey
 

1941 births
Living people
20th-century presidents of Turkey
21st-century presidents of Turkey
People from Afyonkarahisar
Presidents of Turkey
Turkish judges
Turkish civil servants
Ankara University Faculty of Law alumni
Recipients of the Collar of the Order of the Cross of Terra Mariana
Presidents of the Constitutional Court of Turkey